Ken'yū, Kenyu or Kenyuu (written: 賢雄 or 健勇) is a masculine Japanese given name. Notable people with the name include:

 (born 1957), Japanese voice actor
 (born 1992), Japanese footballer

Japanese masculine given names